The SS City of Flint was a cargo ship of a type known colloquially as a Hog Islander, due to it being built at the Hog Island Shipyard, Philadelphia by American International Shipbuilding for the United States Shipping Board (USSB), Emergency Fleet Corporation. City of Flint was named to honor the citizens of Flint, Michigan for their effort in Liberty Loan drives during World War I.

The ship was sold to the Southgate Nelson Co., American Hampton Roads Line in 1930, but reverted to the USSB by 1935. By 1940 the USSB had been replaced by the United States Maritime Commission as owner and the ship was being operated as a Maritime Commission cargo vessel. During World War II City of Flint was being operated by United States Lines allocated to Army cargo requirements.

City of Flint was the first American ship captured by Nazi Germany during World War II.

The Athenia
The City of Flint, under the command of Captain Joseph A. Gainard, first became involved in the war when she rescued 200 survivors of the torpedoed British passenger liner  on 3 September 1939. Athenia had been torpedoed that afternoon by the  commanded by Kapitanleutnant Fritz-Julius Lemp south of Rockall Bank (in the Atlantic Ocean west of Scotland and south of Iceland) and sent out a distress signal. City of Flint, the Norwegian freighter Knute Nelson, the Swedish yacht Southern Cross and the destroyers  and  responded to rescue survivors.

The Captain of HMS Electra, Lt Cdr Sammy A. Buss, took charge as senior officer present. He sent the destroyer  on an anti-submarine sweep of the area, while Electra, Escort, Southern Cross, Knute Nelson and the City of Flint rescued the survivors. Between the ships, about 981 passengers and crew were rescued. City of Flint rescued more than 200 and the provisions for American passengers leaving Europe who had embarked at Glasgow contributed to the welfare of the survivors. One hundred and twelve people were killed, and Athenia sank the next morning.

Seizure
In October 1939, City of Flint was carrying a cargo of tractors, grain and fruit to Britain. On 9 October, the  seized the City of Flint, declaring her cargo to be contraband and the ship a prize of war. A German prize crew was put on board the ship to sail her back to Germany.

To avoid ships of the Royal Navy and obtain water, the ship headed for Tromsø on the north coast of Norway, arriving on 20 October 1939. Norway, neutral at the time and disturbed by the sinking of the merchant ship , refused entry to the Germans, giving them 24 hours to leave. The Norwegian destroyer  escorted the City of Flint out of Norwegian territorial waters at 1620hrs the next day.

The prize crew then sailed for Murmansk in the Soviet Union, arriving on 23 October. Claiming havarie (the privilege of sanctuary for damage caused at sea), the ship lay in Murmansk harbor under the control of the German prize crew for several days and was eventually forced to leave by the Soviet Union, stating that if the Germans claimed havarie, the American crew could not be prisoners of war. The Soviets interned the German prize crew on 24 October but restored them to control on 27 October under the principle requiring a ship to leave in the same condition as on entry. On 28 October the ship sailed for Norway under German control without Captain Gainard, who was an inactive United States Naval Reserve officer, having been allowed to communicate with United States Embassy officials.

In the several weeks that elapsed, the United States ordered many US merchant ships to register with other countries, so as to continue supporting the Allies without violating the US's nominal neutrality. Meanwhile, the Royal Navy began closing on the captured ship.

The prize crew then tried Norway again, proceeding to the port of Haugesund. The Norwegian government again refused entry, describing the German crew as kidnappers. The approaching Royal Navy left the prize crew no choice, though; on 3 November the City of Flint entered the harbor.

The ship anchored in Norway, and no one could claim the crew was making her right for passage. In consequence the Norwegian Admiralty dispatched the minelayer  and boarded the City of Flint with its second in command, captain Bernt T. Dingsør and thirty armed sailors, who on 6 November returned City of Flint to Captain Gainard's command. He unloaded his cargo in Bergen and set sail in ballast for the US. The German prize crew was interned at Kongsvinger Fortress.

Footnotes

References

Bibliography

External links
"Voyage of the Flint" (LIFE Magazine, 4 March 1940: Article by Captain Joseph A. Gainard)
Joseph Freer and Raymond Trumpe Papers, 1927–1988 (bulk 1939–1943) MS 244 held by Special Collection & Archives, Nimitz Library at the United States Naval Academy

1919 ships
Design 1022 ships
 
Captured ships
World War II merchant ships of the United States
Ships sunk by German submarines in World War II
World War II shipwrecks in the Atlantic Ocean
Maritime incidents in January 1943